Texas Tommy may refer to:

 Texas Tommy (dance), a social dance
 Texas Tommy (dance move), a dance move
 Texas Tommy (food), a grilled, split hot dog with bacon and cheese
 Texas Tommy (film), 1928 American film